{{DISPLAYTITLE:C30H18O10}}
The molecular formula C30H18O10 (molar mass: 538.46 g/mol, exact mass: 538.0900 u) may refer to:

 Amentoflavone
 Ochnaflavone

Molecular formulas